John Chartres Molony (27 February 1877 – 5 September 1948) was an administrator and civil servant of the Indian civil service.

Early life 

Molony was born on 27 February 1877 at Ennis in County Clare, Ireland to  James Barry Molony and Ellen Greene. Molony had his schooling at Portora Royal School, Enniskillen and graduated from Trinity College Dublin. Molony passed the Indian civil service examination in 1899.

Career 

Molony arrived in India in 1900 and was appointed Assistant Collector and Magistrate in the Madras Presidency and later rose to become District Collector. From 1908 to 1910, Molony served as Assistant Political Agent to the state of Banganapalle. Molony was the Census Commissioner for the Madras Presidency during the 1911 India census.

Molony served as president and Mayor of the Madras Corporation from 1914 to 1919 and City Commissioner in 1920. Molony retired from the Indian civil service in 1925 and returned to the United Kingdom

Death 
Molony died on 5 September 1948 at the age of 71.

Works 
 .

References 

 

1877 births
1948 deaths
Irish civil servants
People from Ennis
Alumni of Trinity College Dublin
Irish people in colonial India